The broker pattern is an architectural pattern that can be used to structure distributed software systems with decoupled components that interact by remote procedure calls. A broker component is responsible for coordinating communication, such as forwarding requests, as well as for transmitting results and exceptions.

Definition 

The broker pattern is an architecture pattern that involves the use of an intermediary software entity called "broker" to facilitate communication between two or more software components. The broker acts as a "middleman" between the components, allowing them to communicate without being directly aware of each other's existence.

In the broker pattern, the broker is responsible for receiving messages from one component and forwarding them to the appropriate recipient. The components that communicate through the broker are known as servers or clients. The broker may also perform additional tasks, such as filtering, modifying messages, ensuring a quality of service (QoS) e.g. 0 for "at most once", or security , or providing additional services to the software components.

The broker pattern allows the components to remain decoupled and focused on their own responsibilities, while still being able to communicate and collaborate with other components in the system. It can also be used to reduce the number of dependencies between components, making the system more flexible and easier to maintain.

Terminology 
Broker
 Maintain a routing table of registered software components.
 Maintain a filter table to reroute the transiting messages to the right software components.
 May assure additional functionalities such as information security and quality of service.

Server
 Software components responsible for sending a message out.
 It can also be found under the name of publisher.

Client
 Software components that subscribed and awaits a specific message.
 It can also be found under the following names:
 Consumer
 Subscriber

Advantages 
 Dynamic changes, additions, deletions and relocations of components possible.
 One source of communication with / to the broker. which define the interface.
 Components do not need to know each other.

Disadvantages 
 One central component that needs to be robust and efficiently written.
 No data consistency of transmitted messages.

Real-life implementation of the pattern 
 Message broker
 RabbitMQ
 MQTT

Confusions around the pattern 
There is a lot of amalgam with the publish–subscribe pattern because it shares a certain amount of similarities (e.g. MQTT-Client-Broker-Explained by HiveMQ) . Nevertheless, when it comes to the representation, there are some core differences:
 The Broker architectural pattern is represented by a Many to One to Many diagram.
 The Publish-subscribe architectural pattern is represented by Many to Many diagram. Here, the messaging functionalities are hidden as a Cross-cutting concern.

References

Software design patterns